Kerry Ellis Sings the Great British Songbook was the first set of solo concerts by English stage actress and singer Kerry Ellis. The tour, comprising dates at the Shaw Theatre in London in June 2009, saw her through a set list of more than 20 numbers with an encore that included Brian May.

Background

Synopsis

Setlist

Tour dates

Personnel

References

External links 

 1
 2
 3
 4
 5
 6

2009 concert tours
Kerry Ellis